This is a list of notable theatres in the German state of North Rhine-Westphalia, organized by administrative district.

Rhineland

Region of Düsseldorf 

 Burgtheater Dinslaken – Dinslaken
 Die Säule – Duisburg
 Fabrik Heeder – Krefeld
 Freilichtbühne Mülheim an der Ruhr – Mülheim
 Krieewelsche Pappköpp – Krefeld
 Metronom Theater – Oberhausen
 Rheinisches Landestheater Neuss – Neuss
 Schlosstheater Moers – Moers
 TAM – Krefeld
 Teo Otto Theater – Remscheid
 Theater am Marientor – Duisburg
 Theater an der Ruhr – Mülheim
 Theater Duisburg – Duisburg
 Theater Oberhausen – Oberhausen
 Werner-Jaeger-Halle – Nettetal
 XOX-Theater Kleve – Kleve

City of Düsseldorf 

 Altes Schauspielhausgebäude Düsseldorf
 Altes Theater
 Apollo-Theater
 Capitol Theater
 Deutsche Oper am Rhein
 Düsseldorfer Marionetten-Theater
 Düsseldorfer Schauspielhaus
 Forum Freies Theater
 Kom(m)ödchen
 Komödie Düsseldorf
 Palais Wittgenstein
 Stadttheater Düsseldorf
 Theater FLIN

City of Essen 

 Aalto Theatre
 Colosseum Theater
 Das Kleine Theater Essen
 GOP Varieté Essen
 Grillo-Theater
 Theater im Rathaus

City of Wuppertal 

 Comödie
 Das Vollplaybacktheater
 Kulturzentrum Bandfabrik
 Müllers Marionetten-Theater
 Opernhaus Wuppertal
 Rex-Theater
 Schauspielhaus Wuppertal
 Thalia-Theater
 Theater in Cronenberg
 Wupper-Theater
 Wuppertaler Bühnen

Region of Cologne 

 Grenzlandtheater Aachen – Aachen
 Öcher Schängche – Aachen
 Opernwerkstatt am Rhein – Hürth
 Puppenpavillon Bensberg – Bergisch Gladbach
 Stadttheater Düren – Düren
 Studiobühne Siegburg – Siegburg
 Theater Aachen – Aachen
 Violettas Puppenbühne – Wegberg

City of Bonn 
 Contra-Kreis-Theater
 Euro Theater Central Bonn
 Junges Theater Bonn
 Theater Bonn

City of Cologne 

 Arkadaş Theater
 Bühnen der Stadt Köln
 Cassiopeia Theater
 D.a.S. Theater
 Futur3
 Gloria-Theater
 Hänneschen-Theater
 Kumede
 Musical Dome
 Schauspiel Köln
 Senftöpfchen
 Studiobühne Köln
 Tazzelwurm (Varieté)
 Theater am Dom
 Theater Tiefrot
 Volkstheater Millowitsch

Westfalen-Lippe

Region of Arnsberg 

 Apollo-Theater
 Fletch Bizzel
 Freilichtbühne Herdringen
 Hagen Theatre
 Hansa Theater Hörde
 Kulturhaus Lüdenscheid
 Mondpalast
 Prinz-Regent-Theater
 Rottstraße 5 Theater
 Schauspielhaus Bochum

Region of Detmold 

 Detmolder Sommertheater
 Kahle Wart
 Landestheater Detmold
 Stadttheater Herford
 Stadttheater Minden
 Theater Gütersloh
 Westfälische Kammerspiele

Region of Munster 

 Alte Brennerei Schwake
 Freilichtbühne Billerbeck
 Musiktheater im Revier
 Theater im Pumpenhaus
 Theater Münster
 Westfälisches Landestheater
 Wolfgang Borchert Theater

 
North Rhine-Westphalia
Theatre